Dorothy Shore Zinberg was an American scholar at Harvard Kennedy School and an Elected Fellow of the American Association for the Advancement of Science. Dr. Zinberg taught in the sociology department at Harvard and continued to lecture at the Kennedy School. She trained as a biochemist and sociologist, and was a founding member of the Belfer Center for Science and International Affairs at the Kennedy School. Zinberg married Norman Zinberg, with whom she had two daughters, Annie and Sarah, in 1956 until his death in 1989. She maintained a close relationship with Julia Child.

Biography 
Dr. Zinberg was the daughter of Ernest and Esther Shore and attended Brookline High School. After graduating she received a Bachelor's degree in biology and chemistry, as well as a Master's in sociology from Boston University. She graduated from Harvard University with a PhD in sociology. She worked as a teaching and research assistant at Harvard Medical School and served as a visiting scholar at numerous international research institutions, including the Institute of Policy and Management at Chinese Academy of Sciences in Beijing, the Institute for Human Sciences in Vienna, and the National Institute for Science and Technology Policy in Tokyo.

Dr. Zinberg died Tuesday, 14 April 2020 of congestive heart failure.

References

1928 births
2020 deaths
American scientists
Fellows of the American Association for the Advancement of Science
Harvard Graduate School of Arts and Sciences alumni
People from Hyde Park, Boston